Berthold Stein (1847–1899) was a Prussian botanist and lichenologist. After working as a disciple at the Botanical Garden in Berlin in 1865 he became superintendent at the Innsbruck Botanical Garden. He held this position from 1873 to 1880, during which he also started to collect lichens. From 1880 to 1890 he was royal superintendent at the University of Wrocław Botanical Garden. Based on a quote in 1879 by Stein himself he can be considered as a student of Gustav Körber. His main area of interest was the flora of Silesia.

He worked extensively on the taxonomy of the genera Masdevallia, Pescatoria (as Pescatorea) and Paphiopedilum in the orchid family.

Publications

Books 
 1879. Flechten. Kryptogamen-Flora von Schlesien. Second Part. With Ferdinand Cohn. Ed. J.U. Kern, 400 pp.
 1882. Lichenes Maderenses at Mindanaoenses. Verhandl. der Schlesischen Gesellsch. fur vaterlánd. Kultur.
 1882. Uebersicht der gegenwärtig in den europäischen gärten cultivirten primeln.
 1889. Ueber afrikanische Flechten
 1890. Übersicht über die auf Dr hans meyer's drei Ostafrika-expeditionen (1887–89) gesammelten Flechten
 1892. Stein's Orchideenbuch. Beschreibung, Abbildung und Kulturanweisung der empfehlenswertesten Arten. Mit 184 in den Text gedruckten Abbildungen.

Journals 
 Drei Cerastien. Österreichische Botanische Zeitschrift. Vol. 28, No. 1 (January 1878), pp. 18–27

Eponymous taxa 
 Steinia Zahlbr.
 Acarospora steinii Körb.
 Gyalecta steinii E.K.Novák
 Lecidea steinii Zahlbr.
 Leptorhaphis steinii Körb.
 Populus × steiniana Bornm.
 Primula × steinii'' Obrist ex Stein. Likely named after the village of Steinach in Austria where this natural hybrid was found. "Im Kalkgeröll des hinteren Önnes im Gschnitsthale bei Steinnach (Central-Alpen Tirols) in 2000 M. Höhe in einem eizigen Rasen gefunden."
 The abbreviation "Stein" is used to indicate Berthold Stein as an authority on the scientific description and classification of plants.

References

Notes

External links 

1847 births
1899 deaths
Lichenologists